Usborne Publishing, often called Usborne Books, is a British publisher of children's books. Founded by Peter Usborne in 1973, Usborne Publishing uses an in-house team of writers, editors and designers. One of its sales channels is Usborne Books at Home, a multi-level marketing operation founded in 1981. In the United States, Usborne books are published by Educational Development Corporation.

Quicklinks 
Quicklinks were first introduced in 2000 as a way to incorporate the internet into modern reading habits. Peter Usborne has been quoted in the trade magazine The Bookseller as saying: "I initially thought that the internet would kill non-fiction, because teachers would tell children to use the internet to help with homework. But if you key in 'castles' [on a search engine], you get 900,000 possible websites. The internet is an inadequate resource for children."

See also 
 List of UK children's book publishers

References

External links
 Official website of Usborne Publishing
 Usborne Books at Home

Book publishing companies of the United Kingdom
Multi-level marketing companies